Deng Yuwen (born 16 March 1968) is a Chinese journalist, writer and commentator on current events. He was an editor of the Study Times. He is a visiting scholar at the Institute of China Policy at the University of Nottingham.

Biography
Deng was born in Xinyu, Jiangxu on March 16, 1968. In 2012, he wrote The Political Legacy of Hu Jintao and Wen Jiabao, criticizing the government's policies. In March 2013, he published an article China Should Abandon North Korea in Financial Times, which caused him to lose his job in the Study Times. In 2018, he published an article Seven Tips for Xi Jinping in The New York Times, calling on the rulers to make the country democratic. In July 2020, he published a long article, "The Rise of Chinese Nationalism, the Transition of the Xi Jinping Regime, and the U.S. Response" on the China History and Future website.

Works
 The Right to be Happy 
 China Must Win
 China's Economic Breakthrough
 ''The Last Totalitarian (）

References

External links
 

1968 births
Living people
People from Xinyu
Writers from Jiangxi
People's Republic of China journalists